The following list is a list of United Arab Emirates national football team managers since 1972.

List

By Nationality

References

Lists of national association football team managers
Manager